Doug McMahon (16 October 1917 – 16 April 1997) was a Canadian soccer player, who played in the Football League for Wolverhampton Wanderers. He is an honoured member of the Canada Soccer Hall of Fame.

Born in Winnipeg, Manitoba, McMahon signed for Wolves in 1938 and made his debut on 1 January 1939 against Blackpool. He played with them until 1940 and the interruption of play in England due to World War II. During the 1939-40 West Midlands (Regional) League play, McMahon had an impressive nine goals in six games for the Wolves 'A' team, when league play was halted. During the war, McMahon served with Royal Canadian Naval Volunteer Reserves. In England he guested for Chester, scoring six times against Stockport County in December 1939.

In 1946 McMahon played part of the season for the Chicago Maroons in the newly formed North American Soccer Football League.  He played for Eastern Canada selects against the Eastern United States in 1947 and 1948 and then Scotland in 1949. In 1948, McMahon won a Canadian championship medal with Montreal Carsteel. Across all competitions that year, he scored a local record 71 goals, breaking Eddie MacLaine's old record of 60 goals on 25 September.

Personal life
Doug's father Sandy was a notable soccer referee in Winnipeg. Doug's brother Bill was also a soccer player.

References

External links
 / Canada Soccer Hall of Fame
Canada Soccer Hall of Fame
Canada Soccer Records & Results

1917 births
1997 deaths
Canadian expatriate sportspeople in the United States
Canadian expatriate soccer players
Canada Soccer Hall of Fame inductees
Canadian soccer players
Chester City F.C. wartime guest players
Chicago Vikings players
Expatriate footballers in England
Expatriate soccer players in the United States
Association football forwards
Montreal Carsteel players
North American Soccer Football League players
Soccer players from Winnipeg
English Football League players
Wolverhampton Wanderers F.C. players
Canadian expatriate sportspeople in England
Canadian National Soccer League players